Caroline Marks is an American professional surfer. She is a multiple national champion and the youngest female to compete in a World Surf League event. She is the youngest surfer to qualify for the women’s Championship Tour.

She competed in the elite (top 16) of the World Surf League and ended 2018 season in 7th place, becoming Rookie of the Year. She was born in Boca Raton, Florida on 14 February 2002 and lives in Melbourne Beach, Florida.

On December 1st, 2019, Caroline qualified as one of the two women of the USA’s first surfing team to compete in the 2020 Summer Olympics in Tokyo, Japan.

Early years 
Marks' grandmother was raised in Greece where she gave birth to Marks' mother who later moved to the United States and gave birth to Marks in Florida. The third of six children, Marks grew up in Melbourne Beach, Florida. She has a younger sister and four brothers, two younger and two older than her. The house she grew up in had a big backyard with a motorbike-track, halfpipe, and a surf break across the street. She discovered her love of sports on horseback through barrel racing and began surfing competitively when she was 8 years old. Marks and her siblings have all supported and encouraged each other in their individual passions.  When her older brother Zach was 12, he created the social media site Grom Social for kids, and Marks helped create images and characters for the site. She continues to post on the site as herself, updating users on her adventures and accomplishments. Likewise, her brother, other siblings and the rest of her family have been a constant presence at her competitions, cheering her on, giving her pointers and shouldering her when she takes home a win. Marks attributes her success and how good she is to her brothers and her roots of trying to impress them when she was growing up.

Career

2018 
In 2018, her first year on tour, she had three third-place finishes in 10 events, was named rookie of the year and finished the season ranked seventh in the world.

2019 
In April 2019, at the first event of the WSL Championship tour, Marks defeated seven-time world champion Stephanie Gilmore at the Australian's home break of Duranbah, New South Wales in the quarter-finals of the Boost Mobile Pro Gold Coast. She then continued through the semi-finals beating Malia Manuel from Kauai. In the finals, she defeated three-time world champion Carissa Moore from Oahu, to claim her first WSL event title (beginning the 2019 season as the world's top-ranked female surfer).

She is the first surfer to receive Team USA’s Best of April Award, which recognizes the outstanding achievements of prospective Team USA Olympic athletes. “Caroline is one of those rare athletes that from when she was 12 years old it was obvious that she was going to be world champion,” said USA Surfing head coach Chris Stone. “Not if, but when. To see what she’s doing at 17 years old must be frightening to all her competitors. I can’t wait to see what the future holds for her.”

2019 World Championship Tour 
In December 2019, she finished second on the WSL Championship tour to Carissa Moore. By finishing second, Marks earned a spot on the team for the 2020 Olympics in Tokyo, along with Moore.

2021 
Marks tested positive for COVID-19 in advance of a World Surf League competition in Australia in early 2021 and later found out it was a false positive, which nullified her fears of not being able to compete.

2020 Summer Olympics 

Marks was the youngest surfer to qualify to compete at the 2020 Summer Olympics postponed to July and August 2021 due to the COVID-19 pandemic and held in Tokyo, Japan.

In round one of shortboard competition, Marks scored a total of 13.40 points, won her heat, and advanced directly to round three of competition. In the third round of competition, a head-to head elimination round where two surfers competed in each heat and only the highest scoring surfer advanced to the quarterfinals, Marks won her heat against Mahina Maeda with a score of 15.33 and advanced to the quarterfinals of competition. Her score of 15.33 was the highest score of all the competitors, male or female, in the third round of competition for all surfing events at the 2020 Olympics.

In the quarterfinals, Marks won her head-to-head heat against Brisa Hennessy with a score of 12.50 points and qualified for the semifinals. Marks did not advance to the final heat in her semifinal match against Bianca Buitendag, instead she advanced to the heat determining the winner of the bronze medal. In her final match against Amuro Tsuzuki, Tsuzuki won the bronze medal and Marks ended competition ranked fourth overall.

Junior Event Wins 
 2015 US Open Jr. Champion
 2016 ISA Girls World Champion (U16) 
 2016 US Open Jr. Champion

Open Event Wins 

 2015 Volcom World VQS Champion
 2x Open Women’s NSSA Champion
 6x Surfing America Champion 
 2x Open Girls NSSA Champion

WSL Qualifying Series Wins 

 2018 WQS Los Cabos Pro Winner
 2018 WQS Florida Pro Winner
 2019 WQS Florida Pro Winner

WSL Championship Tour Podiums 

 2018 WSL Rip Curl Women's Pro: 3rd Place
 2018 Vans US Open of Surfing: 3rd Place
 2018 Surf Ranch Pro: 3rd Place
 2019 WSL Boost Mobile Pro Gold Coast: 1st Place
 2019 WSL Rip Curl Women's Pro: 3rd Place
 2019 WSL Corona Open J-Bay: 3rd Place
2019 MEO Rip Curl Pro Portugal: 1st Place

Personal 
Marks has a YouTube channel she started 23 February 2021 where she uploads videos related to her surfing. Her first video featured her surfing with Lakey Peterson.

Marks is a feminist and an advocate for body image positivity in women aiming to reduce the sexualization of women's bodies when they are still going through puberty.

References

External links
Profile in World Surf League
Instagram profile
Facebook profile
Twitter profile

2002 births
Living people
American surfers
Sportspeople from Boca Raton, Florida
People from Melbourne Beach, Florida
Olympic surfers of the United States
Surfers at the 2020 Summer Olympics
American female surfers